Mahe is a legislative assembly constituency in the Union territory of Puducherry in India, covering the area of Mahé. Mahe assembly constituency is part of Puducherry (Lok Sabha constituency).

From 1964 to 2011, the Mahe region had two Assembly Constituencies- Mahe and Palloor. Mahe Assembly constituency included areas of Mahe, Cherukallayi and Chalakkara. Whereas Palloor constituency comprised Palloor and Pandakkal areas.

The Palloor Assembly Constituency was abolished for the 2011 Assembly election. Thus, the whole of Mahe came under the enlarged Mahe Constituency since 2011.

Members of Legislative Assembly
Sources:

Election results

2021

See also
 List of constituencies of the Puducherry Legislative Assembly
 Mahe district

References 

Assembly constituencies of Puducherry
Mahe district